Zeus B. Held is a German music producer and musician, known for his work in the 1970s, 1980s and 1990s. He was involved with several artists of the krautrock, disco, and new wave era, such as Birth Control, Rockets, Gina X Performance, Dead Or Alive, John Foxx, Fashion, and Men Without Hats on their successful album Pop Goes the World.

Besides being an experienced producer and sound creator, his musical education on piano and reed instruments made him also a well-respected arranger. Spending 6 years as keyboard player and multi-instrumentalist with the German prog-rock group "Birth Control" (6 LPs) gave him experience as a touring musician. After these years on the road he worked as producer, session musician, programmer, and engineer in German and French studios before moving to London in 1982.

Career
His production “…combines electronic Teutonic sounds with a soulful sensibility for melodic expression…”. (NME, June 1982)
After writing and producing the groundbreaking album by Gina X Performance Nice Mover, (followed by three more Gina X albums), his first UK production credits were with Fashion and Dead or Alive, he produced Pete Wylie's Sinful album and an album by Men Without Hats for Polygram US which yielded a number one in many European countries and a US Top 20 hit with "Pop Goes The World". This was followed by two albums with Transvision Vamp on MCA with a top five single and a number one album. He produced the album Freaky Trigger (1989) by the scottish group Win. Zeus went on to write and produce two successful albums with Nina Hagen (Nina Hagen in 1990, and Street in 1991), Udo Lindenberg's Casanova, National Velvet, Spear of Destiny, and two albums with Marc Parrot.

He has produced and co-written an album with South African group Shikisha, an EP with Victoria Wilson-James, and recorded and produced an album with Hawkwind – Distant Horizons.

In 1995 he wrote and recorded the music for a worldwide advertising campaign for Swatch. His 1987 'E Reg' remix of Gary Numan's "Cars" hit the British charts again as the 'Premier Mix' in March '96.

After extended travelling round the world he produced his own two projects: No Sweat, a jazzy hip hop album with diverse guest singers and assorted samples and involving his collected samples "Inma Wiru", his Australian project under the banner of "Digital Dreaming", distributed by Warner Music. During his long stays in Australia Zeus also toured and recorded with Aboriginal Singer and Guitarist Frank Yamma and his band.

In 1999 he co-wrote Nina Hagen's single "Der Poetenclub" which also features the voice of Falco (of "Rock Me Amadeus" fame).
His production and arranging skills led to intensive work on audio-visuals and soundtracks, one of which was a British film shown at the Cannes 2001 festival, Mad Dogs.

Since 2003 he has divided his time between working in his Freiburg, Germany-based studio and his London KGBeat studio and production setup.
From 2005 Zeus he also worked with "Jazz & Rock Schulen Freiburg", where he created and realised the 3-year project "EuroPop", which was a musician's networking, events (EuroPop Festival in Neuf-Brisach) and education program founded by the European Union.
His musical ventures saw Zeus writing for and playing with big bands and orchestras. The 2011 retrospective album, Voice-Versa, featuring solo material as well as tracks by Gina X Performance and Rockets is a compilation of vocoder and electronic music.
The release of his remixed and remastered Australian album Dream2Machine on the Broome-based label Desert Ocean Productions in late 2013 also marks Zeus' continual creative collaboration with Jim Lampi and his multimedia approach to music and the arts.

His solo adventure Logic of Coincidence, released June 2015 on Les Disques du Crepuscule, is an album of electronic music which features US cult author Luke Rhinehart's voice and readings on two tracks.
A remix of one album track by "Dream Control" marks the start of Zeus' collaboration with former Tangerine Dream member Steve Schroyder.
In August 2017 Dream Control's first album entitled "Zeitgeber" is released on Planetware Records. In October a special edited vinyl version of this album was released on U.S. label Medical Records.
Currently Dream Control is working on a film project which should be released in early 2021.
In 2019 Zeus teamed up with Krautrocklegend and Guru Guru band leader Mani Neumeier to record an album of adventurous tracks under the name of Mani & Zeus "The Secret Lives". Released on Düsseldorf label Bellerophon Records in September 2020 it had some great response by the media.
In October 2020 Zeus was awarded with the City of Cologne's Holger Czukay Prize in “appreciation of life's work” for his writing and production work with "Gina X Performance".

Discography

Albums
 Birth Control : 7 albums as keyboard, saxophonist and co-writer in the 70s.
 Zeus B. Held (solo): Zeus' Amusement 1978 Metronome,
 Europium 1979, Teldec/Telefunken
 "Attack Time" 1981 CBS,
 Visionova (Soundtrack) 1980, Sport & Culture
 Gina X Performance: "Nice Mover" 1978 EMI, "X- Traordinaire" 1980 EMI,
 "Voyeur" 1981 EMI, "Yinglish" 1981 Statik/Virgin UK
 Fashion: "Fabrique" 1982 Arista, "Twilight of Idols" 1984 CBS
 John Foxx: "The Golden Section" 1983 Virgin
 Dead or Alive: Sophisticated Boom Boom 1984 CBS
 Chaz Jankel: "Looking at you" 1985 A&M
 Die Krupps: "Entering the Arena" 1985 Voice Versa/Statik
 Spear of Destiny: "Outland" 1986 Virgin,
 Riff: "Mission Love" 1989 RCA
 "S.O.D.'s Law" 1992 Burning Rome Records
 Claire Grogan: "Claire Grogan" 1986 London
 Men Without Hats: "Pop Goes The World" 1987 Polygram US
 Pete Wylie: "Sinful" 1987 Circa/Virgin
 Kamerata: "Lovers & Other Strangers" 1987 Polydor
 Transvision Vamp: "Pop-Art" 1988 MCA, "Velveteen" 1989 MCA
 Win: "Freaky Trigger" 1988 Virgin
 Music Art: Soundtrack for Multi Media Installation, 1988 Champagne Music CH
 Udo Lindenberg "Casanova", 1988 Deutsche Grammophon
 Nina Hagen: "Nina Hagen" 1989 Phonogram GmbH, "Street" 1991 Phonogram GmbH
 National Velvet: "Courage" 1989 Capitol Canada
 Doctor Rain: "The Spoon Run Away" 1991 Imago
 Marc Parrot: "Solo Para Locos" 1992 WEA Spain, "Solo Para Ninos" 1995 WEA Spain
 The Bozfor: "Endorphenia" 1992 EMI-Electrola
 The Fetish: "The Fetish" EP, 1992 
 Aunt Jamima: "Birth" 1993 Sony Germany
 Candy Dates: "This Easy Life" 1994 WEA
 Vortex: "Transistor Revenge" 1995 Vortex/Roadrunner
 Yulduz Usmanova: "Binafscha" 1996 Blue Flame
 Zeus & the Spiritual Traders: "Compassion" 1996 H.A.N.D.spun, BMG
 Vortex : "Energize" 1996 Vortex/Roadrunner
 Strobe: "Lost in Space" 1997 Vortex/Roadrunner
 Octavia: "HipOpera", Janus Media 1998
 Nokturnl : "Point Your Finger". EP, Heartbeat, Australia 1998
 Digital Dreaming : "Inma Wiru 1998, Massive Recordings, Australia
 Shikisha : Maluju, Toshiba/EMI 2000
 Bulletproof Electric Revue : "Cake, Pills and Pain", Northern Recordings, 2002
 Held Lampi Project : "Digital Dreaming", Kissing Fish Music, 2004
 Zeus B. Held : "Voice-Versa", LTM 2011
 Held Lampi Project : "Dream2machine", Desert Ocean Productions, 2013
 Zeus B. Held : "Logic of Coincidence", Les Disques du Crepuscule 2015
 Zeus B. Held : "Vinyl Collection", Medical Records, 2016
 Dream Control : "Zeitgeber" , Planetware Records, 2017
 Mani Neumeier & Zeus B. Held : "The Secret Lives" , Bellerophon Records, 2020

Singles
 Zeus: "Fool on the Hill" 1978 Metronome, "Musik, Music, Musique" 1979 Teldec
 Rockets: "On the Road Again", 1978 Decca France
 Gina X Performance: "Nice Mover”1978 EMI, "No G.D.M" 1979/82 EMI, "No G.D.M '85"
 1985 Statik, "Do It Yourself" 1979 EMI, "Striptease" 1980 EMI, "Weekend Twist"
 1980 EMI, "Drive My Car" 1984 Statik, "Harley Davidson" 1984 Statik
 Fashion: "Move On" 1982 Arista, "Streetplayer" 1982 Arista, "Something in Your Picture" 1982 Arista, "Love Shadow" 1983 Arista, "Eye Talk" 1984 CBS/Sony,
 "Dreaming" 1984 CBS/Sony, "You in the Night" 1984 CBS/Sony
 John Foxx: "Endlessly" 1983 Virgin, "Your Dress" 1983 Virgin, "Like a Miracle" 1983 Virgin
 Dead Or Alive: "What I Want 1983 CBS/Sony, I'd Do Anything" 1983 CBS/Sony, "That's the Way I Like It" 1984 CBS/Sony
 Le Clan: "Vive le Mambo" 1984 MN/Barclay France
 Lilidrop: "Tartine Breakfast" 1982 Eurodisc/Virgin France
 Cha Cha at the Opera: "A Cha Cha at the Opera" 1982 Island
 Impulse: "The Prize" 1983 Polydor
 This Island Earth: "See That Glow" 1984 Magnet, "Take Me to the Fire" 1985 Magnet
 The Spy: "Big Brother" 1984 Trigger /Disques
 Brilliant: "Wait For It" 1984 WEA
 Ellery Bop: "Torn Apart" 1985 WEA
 Academy: "Tonight" 1985 RCA, "Stand Up" 1985 RCA, “You Are in My System” 1986 RCA, "Keep on Pushing" 1986 RCA
 East of Java: "Different World" 1985 RCA
 Ranch: "Put Your Love in Me" 1985 Sedition/PTR
 The Krupps: "RISK “ 1985 Voice Versa
 Annabella Wu: "Under The Gun" 1985 RCA/Arista
 Angel Chorus: "Devil on My Shoulder" 1986 Virgin
 Pete Wylie: "Diamond Girl" 1986 Virgin
 Michael van Dyke: "I Do" 1986 Metronome
 Spear of Destiny: "Strangers in Our Town" 1986 Virgin, “Never Take Me Alive”, 1987 Virgin, "Was That You?”1987 Virgin, "The Traveller" 1987 Virgin
 Claire Grogan: "Love Bomb" 1987 London Records
 Men Without Hats: "Pop Goes the World" 1987 Phonogram US, "Moonbeam, featuring Ian Anderson" 1988 Phonogram US
 Kamerata: "Heroin" 1987 Polydor GmbH "Charlotte" 1987 Polydor GMBH, "Horseback" 1988 Polydor GMBH
 Eric Robinson: "No.1", 1988 MCA
 Udo Lindenberg : "Airport", "Die Klavierlehrerin" Polydor 1988
 Transvision Vamp: "Tell that girl”1988 MC, "Baby I Don, t Care" 1989 MCA, "Landslide of Love", 1989 MCA, "I want your love" 1990 MCA
 Riff "No Mercy" 1989 RCA
 The Marines: "Go Go Now" 1989 Sony UK, "Say Goodbye" 1989 Sony UK
 Nina Hagen : "Hold Me" Phonogram 1989, "Viva Las Vegas" Phonogram1989 "Michail, Michail" Phonogram 1990
 Riff "All or nothing" 1990 RCA
 Flesh For Lulu: "Every Little Word" 1989 Beggars Banquet
 Barry Ryan: "Turn Away" 1989 BMG/Ariola
 Tony Head: "Sweet Transvestite" 1990 RCA/BMG,
 Sunsonic:  "Drive Away", 1990 Polydor
 Exotic Birds: "Stay OnThis Road" 1990 Alpha
 See See Rider: "Da Da Love" 1990 Lazy
 Nina Hagen : "Blumen Fuer Die Damen", Phonogram 1991 "In My World" Phonogram 1991
 The Fetish :  "Psychotic Sympathy" Voice Versa
 The Bones: "Hot" 1993 EMI-Eletrola, "Come On" 1993 EMI-Eletrola
 Dein Cyan: "An Solchen Tagen" 1994 EMI-Eletrola
 Hexenhaus: "Hallo & Tschuess" 1995 SingSing Record GMBH/Hansa
 Charlie's Angels: "Honey" 1995 Org Records
 Strobe: "In ain't out" 1996 Vortex
 Lani: "Reach for the sky" 1997 Shock Australia
 Zeus & the Spiritual Traders: "Buddha of Compassion", 1997 H.A.N.D.spun
 Disco Pistols: "Talk to Me", Org Records, 1998
 Nina Hagen : "Der Poetenclub", Orbit Records, 2000
 Victoria Wilson James: "Fandango", Arriva, 2000
 Bulletproof Electric Revue : "2 Cut A Long Story Short", Northern Recordings, 2002

Remixes and additional productions
 Dead or Alive: "Misty Circles" 1983 CBS/Sony, "Lover Come Back" 1985 CBS/Sony
 Alphaville: "Big in Japan" 1984 WEA
 Black Uhuru: "Solidarity" 1984 Island
 Peter Godwin: "Window Shopping" 1984 Polydor
 Barb: "Yeah" 1984 Magnet
 Kissing The Pink: "The Other Side of Heaven" 1985 Magnet
 East of Java: "Taipo Say Drum" 1984 RCA/Arista
 5 TA: "Heaven" 1986 Virgin France
 Love & Rockets: "Ying and Yang" 1986 Beggars Banquet
 Pascal Rod: "On En Fera" 1986 Virgin France
 Alliss Terrell: "Miss Florida" 1986 Virgin France
 Etienne Daho:”Tattoo Shoulder" 1986 Virgin France
 Frances: "Piege Pour La" 1986 Virgin France
 Pete Wylie: "Sinful" 1986 Virgin
 Two Nations: "Who Do You Believe?” 1986 Virgin
 Killing Joke: "Love Like Blood" 1986 Virgin, "Adorations" 1986 Virgin,
 "War Dances" 1986 Virgin, Sanity 1986 Virgin
 52nd Street: "Are You Receiving Me?” 1986 Virgin
 Simple Minds: "Ghostdancing" 1986 Virgin, "Jungleland" 1986 Virgin
 Secession: "New Messiah" 1986 Virgin
 The Mission: "Wasteland" 1986 Phonogram
 Super Enig Matix: "Touch The Beat" 1987 MDM Records
 Gary Numan: "Cars" 1987 Beggars Banquet
 The Fall: "Hit The North" 1987 Beggars Banquet
 Udo Lindenberg: "Ein Kommen Und Gehen" 1988 Polydor GMBH
 Plan B: "Beam Me Up Scottie" 1988 SMV
 Erasure: "No G.D.M". 1990 Mute
 Exotic Birds: "Road to Heaven", 1990 Alpha
 Azucar Moreno: "Torero" 1991 Sony Spain
 The Bones: "Come On" 1993 EMI-Electrola
 Fields of the Nephilim: "Exodus", EP 1996 Beggars Banquet
 Yulduz Usmanova: "Binafscha”1996 Blue Flame
 Willie & The W.W.S.: "Mumbridge Boogie" 1997 Massive Records
 Hawkwind: "Love in Space" 1998 EBS/Vital

Music for audio-visuals and campaigns
 Advertisement: C&A, Swatch, Audi, Rowntree, Marbles, Direct Line, Weightwatchers, Africa Aid,
 TV:  ZDF, BBC2, Saturday Review, Channel Plus, Trouble TV, CAAMA TV,
 Films: Le Cauchemar, Blind Man, Mad Dogs

References

External links
zeusbheld.com                         /
Kgbeat.com
dream-control.com
Birth Control – History

1950 births
German record producers
Living people
Brain Records artists